Sobięcin ([sɔˈbjɛnt͡ɕin]; , ; until 1929 "Niederhermsdorf", also "Nieder Hermsdorf") is part of Wałbrzych (German: "Waldenburg") in the Lower Silesian Voivodeship in Poland. Before 1950 Sobięcin was an independent rural community.

Wałbrzych